is a 25-year-old fictional character in the Final Fantasy series, and a protagonist in Final Fantasy XII. He was designed by Akihiko Yoshida, was voiced by Gideon Emery and Hiroaki Hirata in the English and Japanese versions respectively, and is one of the most positively received characters of the game, compared by some to the likes of James Bond and Han Solo.

In Final Fantasy XII, he is a sky pirate who is accompanied by a member of the fictional Viera species, Fran. While attempting to steal the "Goddess's Magicite", they encounter protagonist Vaan, who had already stolen it. This coincidence entangles them into the main plot of XII. His birth name is Ffamran mied Bunansa, and he is the estranged son of Doctor Cid, one of the game's primary antagonists. Balthier later appears in Final Fantasy XII: Revenant Wings and in a cameo appearance in Final Fantasy Tactics: War of the Lions.

Character design
Balthier was designed by Akihiko Yoshida, who has stated that the character is his favorite from Final Fantasy XII since the character is based on "someone I admire". Balthier has been called a "completely original character" by Yoshida, having not used any previous Final Fantasy character as a reference. In an interview, Yoshida said that all the characters of Final Fantasy XII were designed with a focus on creating an aesthetic found nowhere in the real world. The armor of the Judges, which Balthier had been, were designed as a combination of historical armor, mountain bike gear, and futuristic ideas. During the making of the game, there were some issues with the character's faces; In one scene Balthier asked Vaan how he was feeling which brought laughter to the staff because in that scene Vaan's face was poorly modelled. In retrospective, Square Enix members found Balthier as an appealing character and jokingly stated Vaan would need an entire decade to surpass him. Balthier was also meant to appear in another Final Fantasy XII game where the character would appear within the game's climax to assist its protagonists, Ashe and Basch, but the game was cancelled.

Attributes
For Final Fantasy XII, Balthier was voiced by Gideon Emery in English and Hiroaki Hirata in Japanese. Emery commented that while voicing the character of Balthier, he developed a "small crush" on Fran, Balthier's partner. He also commented that the biggest challenge of voicing Balthier was having to stay consistent, adding that he spent more than four hours in a small booth while doing the voice, which could cause him to "drift away from the character" if he goes on for too long. He also described him as being similar to the character. Emery auditioned for Balthier, seeing him after he did this and "instantly fell in love with the character". He described him as a cross between Han Solo, James Bond, and Jack Sparrow, citing suave yet cocky attitude. He was thankful that he was not aware of Balthier's popularity since his reveal, stating that he would have been "crippled by the fear of not delivering on what the fans expected". He said that he took no inspiration from anyone else for the role, wanting to ensure that he was unique. Instead, he cited the pictures and animation of the character as his inspiration. Emery cited Jack Fletcher, the voice director, as a great help in voicing the character and setting up the scene for him. To give Final Fantasy XII a Western feel, Balthier's movements were recorded by a Western motion capture actor.

Balthier is a Hume sky pirate who pilots the Strahl, a small airship, around the skies of Ivalice. VideoGamer.com editor Greg Vallentin made a similar comparison, calling him a "Han Solo-like sky pirate".

Appearances

Final Fantasy XII
Balthier and his companion, Fran, prefer to remain outside the war between the kingdoms of Ivalice. However, their attempt to steal the Goddess's Magicite—later revealed to be the Dusk Shard—from the Dalmascan Royal Palace goes bad; Vaan steals it first, and, caught in the fray of a rebel assault against the Imperial Palace, Balthier and Fran find themselves embroiled in the conflict against Archadia. Although Cid had made him an Imperial Judge, Ffamran eventually decided to cut his ties with his father and his role as a judge, becoming a sky pirate under a new name. With this new career change, Balthier amounted a sizable bounty on his head, attracting the attention of bounty hunters such as Ba'Gamnan. For Balthier, it took him a while to realize he'd been following his father in pursuing nethicite while he served in the resistance. Though he makes peace with his father prior to his death, Balthier goes with the group to destroy the Sky Fortress Bahamut as penance for his father's deeds. Balthier claims to be the "leading man" of the story many times throughout the game, and insists that this status makes him invincible. During the final fight on the Sky Fortress Bahamut, Fran is badly injured and Balthier refuses to abandon her. While cradling her in his arms the ship crashes with them inside. They remain out of contact until they retrieve the Strahl back from Vaan and Penelo a year later, leaving a note for the new Queen Ashe which held her wedding ring that she used to purchase his services.

Other games
Both he and Fran intend on finding the Cache of Glabados, which is resolved in Final Fantasy XII: Revenant Wings when it turns out to be tied to Eternal. Balthier was at first intent to take Lemures' treasure, the Auracite, but knew the truth behind it and attempted to destroy the Auralith, eventually rejoining Vaan's group to fight the Judge of Wings, letting Vaan be the "leading man" while he himself leaves the limelight. He makes a crossover appearance in Final Fantasy Tactics: The War of the Lions. He was the first cameo character they added to War of the Lions, with co-producer Shingo Kosuge stating that it was not a conscious decision to add continuity to the Ivalice story. He also appears in Itadaki Street Portable. Balthier also reprises his role from Final Fantasy XII in the manga adaptation by Gin Amou.

While Balthier himself doesn't appear in Final Fantasy XIV, players can acquire his attire via the Sky Pirate's Aiming gear set in the "Return To Ivalice" chapter "The Orbonne Monastery". His Viera partner Fran also appears as a prominent non-playable character in the narrative. Producer Naoki Yoshida had expressed an interest in Balthier appearing in Final Fantasy XIV but the idea was ultimately scrapped.

Merchandise
A Balthier figurine was sold randomly in Japanese sets of Final Fantasy XII characters. Square Enix released a Sculpture Arts set of Balthier and Fran escaping the palace of Rabanastre in 2008. A full-colored action figure of Balthier has also been displayed in the Square Enix Japan merchandise page.

Reception
Since his appearance in Final Fantasy XII, Balthier has received mostly positive reception. When he was first revealed, the fan response was very positive. GameSpys Justin Speer described him as a "clever-bastard type", praising his wry delivery. GameSpots Greg Kasavin called Balthier the best character in the game, describing him as the "Auron of the cast". 1UP.com editor Jeremy Parish called Final Fantasy XII protagonist Vaan annoying, placing the duo of Balthier and Fran above him. 1UP.coms Andrew Pfister stated that Balthier's presence in XII helped ease some fans dislike of the "angsty teen" behavior of the main character Vaan. PSX Extreme editor Cavin Smith commented that while Vaan is the main character, he usually takes a back seat, adding that Balthier is the closest thing to a male lead. For similar reasons, GameZone listed Balthier as the tenth best Final Fantasy character, emphasizing how Balthier becomes "as much the leading man as Vaan". PALGNs Phil Larsen commented that though a lofty prediction, he expected that the duo of Balthier and Fran would "go down in history as one of the greatest duos of modern narrative storytelling". Balthier ranked ninth on IGNs top 25 best Final Fantasy characters, ranking higher than any other character from Final Fantasy XII. Editor Dave Smith commented that he makes a "convincing case" that he is the main hero, upstaging fellow playable characters due to his "sharp looks and even sharper wit". GamesRadars AJ Glasser listed Balthier and Fran as one of her favourite Final Fantasy couples, describing theirs as being a well-balanced relationship. Destructoids Aaron Linde noted that few video game characters had both his intelligence and his common sense, and wished more male characters in gaming could be like him.

Balthier has been compared to other characters in fiction. Simon Wigham of Console Obsession called Balthier his "favourite by quite a wide margin", comparing him to James Bond due to his "humorous lines". RPGFan editor Stephen Harris compared his voice to that of Ian Fleming's depiction of Bond. 1UP.com editor Andrew Pfister compared the duo of Balthier and Fran to that of Han Solo and Chewbacca, two characters from the Star Wars franchise, adding that they are far more interesting than any other character in the "modern FF era". Gideon Emery's work as Balthier's English voice actor was acclaimed by Eurogamer writer Martin Robinson as one of the best ones from the entire game as "it's fascinating to think how the game's wider perception might have changed if he was placed as the leading man". Final Fantasy XII: The Zodiac Age producer Hiroaki Katō discussed the possibilities of Balthier and Fran of having their own spin-off games based on gamers' demands. 1UP.com editor Jeremy Parish compared Balthier to Albus, one of the characters from Castlevania: Order of Ecclesia, stating that they share a physical resemblance.

References

Air pirates
Characters designed by Akihiko Yoshida
Fictional criminals in video games
Fantasy video game characters
Fictional pirates in video games
Final Fantasy characters
Final Fantasy XII
Male characters in video games
Square Enix protagonists
Video game characters introduced in 2006

ja:ファイナルファンタジーXII#主要人物